Deudorix diocles, the orange-barred playboy, is a butterfly of the family Lycaenidae. It is found in Mozambique, from Zimbabwe to Zaïre and in Uganda, Kenya and South Africa. In South Africa it is found along the east coast from the Eastern Cape to KwaZulu-Natal, then north along the foothills of the escarpment to Mpumalanga and Limpopo.

The wingspan is 26–36 mm for males and 29–41 mm for females. Adults are on wing year-round with peaks in September and March.

The larvae feed on the fruits and seeds of a wide range of plants, including Bauhinia galpinii, Millettia species (including M. caffra, M. sutherlandii, M. grandis), Caesalpinia pulcherrima, Baphia species (including B. racemosa), Acacia, Bauhinia, Caesalpinia, Schotia, Macadamia, Prunus, Combretum and Syzygium.

References

External links
Die Gross-Schmetterlinge der Erde 13: Die Afrikanischen Tagfalter. Plate XIII 66 c

Butterflies described in 1869
Deudorix
Butterflies of Africa
Taxa named by William Chapman Hewitson